Oleh Bilyi (born 29 May 1993 in Ukraine) is a professional Ukrainian football midfielder who currently plays for club FC Skala Stryi in Ukrainian First League.

Bilyi is the product of the Karpaty Lviv Youth School System. He made his debut for FC Karpaty playing a full-time against FC Arsenal Kyiv on 30 September 2012 in Ukrainian Premier League.

He also played for Ukrainian national football teams in the youth age representation.

References

External links
 
 

1993 births
Living people
Ukrainian footballers
Ukraine youth international footballers
FC Karpaty Lviv players
Ukrainian Premier League players
FC Naftovyk-Ukrnafta Okhtyrka players
FC Hoverla Uzhhorod players
FC Skala Stryi (2004) players
Association football midfielders